Antoine Choquet de Lindu (7 November 1712, in Brest – 7 October 1790, in Brest) was a French architect and military engineer in the service of the French Navy

Life
Entering the Navy as a clerk, like his father, he executed a very large number of very important buildings at Brest, well known for their solidity if not for their elegance and so perfectly fitted to their purpose.  Made sous-ingénieur in 1743, he then became chief engineer in 1746. From 1764 to 1767, the Ministry of the Navy and the Ministry for War were merged, and Choquet de Lindu was attached to the royal corps of engineers, with a commission as an infantry captain (though he was kept on as director of the maritime works of the port of Brest, under Amédée-François Frézier).

Between 1738 and his retirement in 1784 Choquet de Lindu devoted himself to the rebuilding and expansion of the port of Brest, producing "works of all kinds" – barracks, hospitals, magazines, dry docks, shipyards, theatres, prisons, sail and rope factories, dams and docks.  It has been calculated that the buildings built by him over his whole career have a total area of 4,400 square metres.  His main works were a Jesuit chapel attached to the hôpital Saint-Louis, the Brest prison and the three basins of Pontaniou (work on which he restarted in 1751, completing them in 1757).

Works

Buildings
(List drawn from )
1738–1744 : Four Bordenave shipbuilding docks
1740 : Chapel of the Jesuit seminary, known as the chapelle de la marine
1740 : Naval forges
1740 : Second prison of Pontaniou
1740 : Bakery, washroom, laundry and offices of the navy hospital
1740 : Iron and carpentry store
1744–1745 : General magazine
1745–1747 : High ropewalk
1747 : Lead, locks, iron and tar store.
1747 : Shooting range on the quai aux vivres
1747 : Five-furnace bakery on Parc aux vivres
1747 : Expansion of the provision bakery on the lower ropewalk
1750–1751 : Brest prison, closure of the Arsenal of Brest
1751–1757 : Formes or basins of Pontaniou
1753 : Fountain on Quai de la Corderie
1753 : Masts store
1756–1761 : Barrack-block in quartier de la marine
1763–1764 : Second mole at Pontaniou
1766 : Théâtre de la marine – built in 8 months, with a favourable acoustic and good sight-lines throughout
1766–1767 : Matelot barrack-block (second depot) up to the first floor
1766 : Upgrade of the mast-machine
1768–1769 : Iron-store along the first Pontaniou basin
1768–1770 : Four-furnace bakery
1769 : Fountain on quai de Kéravel
1770–1771 : Two mast hangars at Le Salou
1775 : Cover over the third Pontaniou basin
1777–1779 : Barracks behind the hospital
1780 : Pontanézen hospital
the theatre in Brest

He also completed projects outside the port of Brest :

 1756 : port of La Hague
 1772 : shipyard at Landevennec, on the Châteaulin river.
 the tower of the phare du Stiff on the island of Ouessant

Writings
He wrote the "bagne" ("prison") article in Diderot's Encyclopédie, and was a member of the académie de marine.  He published two works:
 1757 : La Description des trois formes du port de Brest
 1759 : La Description du bagne de l'arsenal de Brest

1712 births
1790 deaths
French Navy officers from Brest, France
French military engineers

18th-century French architects
French architects
Contributors to the Supplement of the Encyclopédie (1776–1780)